The 2016–17 Ball State Cardinals women's basketball team will represent Ball State University during the 2016–17 NCAA Division I Women's Basketball Championship season. The Cardinals, led by fifth year head coach Brady Sallee, will play their home games at Worthen Arena as members of the West Division of the Mid-American Conference.

Schedule

|-
!colspan=9 style="background:#C41E3A; color:#FFFFFF;"| Non-conference regular season

|-
!colspan=9 style=""| MAC regular season

|-
!colspan=9 style=""| 

|-
!colspan=9 style=""|

See also
 2016–17 Ball State Cardinals men's basketball team

References

Ball State
Ball State Cardinals women's basketball seasons
Ball State
Ball State
2017 Women's National Invitation Tournament participants